Gleb Tikhonov (born 1992) is a Russian male orienteering competitor.

He won a bronze medal in the mixed relay in the 2014 World Orienteering Championships in Asiago-Lavarone with the Russian team. As a junior, he won a gold medal in the sprint and in the relay at the 2012 Junior World Championships in Košice.

References

External links
 
 

1992 births
Living people
Russian orienteers
Male orienteers
Foot orienteers
World Orienteering Championships medalists
Junior World Orienteering Championships medalists